The Thomas J. Kehrer House is a house located near Jerome, Idaho that was listed on the National Register of Historic Places in 1983.  It was built in 1917 by master stonemason H.T. Pugh.

References

See also

 List of National Historic Landmarks in Idaho
 National Register of Historic Places listings in Jerome County, Idaho

Houses completed in 1917
Houses in Jerome County, Idaho
Houses on the National Register of Historic Places in Idaho
National Register of Historic Places in Jerome County, Idaho